Florian Geffrouais (born 5 December 1988 in Saint-Lô) is a French athlete competing in the decathlon. He represented his country at four consecutive European Championships.

International competitions

Personal bests
Outdoor
100 metres – 11.07 (+1.1 m/s, Brussels 2012)
400 metres – 48.53 (Götzis 2013)
1500 metres – 4:13.95 (Aubagne 2012)
110 metres hurdles – 14.76 (+0.5 m/s, Cannes-la-Bocca 2013)
High jump – 1.96 (Valence 2010)
Pole vault – 5.05 (Nouméa 2012)
Long jump – 7.25 (+1.2 m/s, Valence 2010)
Shot put – 15.63 (Arona 2014)
Discus throw – 47.65 (Angers 2012)
Javelin throw – 64.61 (St Brieuc 2010)
Decathlon – 8164 (Reims 2014)
Indoor
60 metres – 7.08 (Reims 2011)
1000 metres – 2:37.49 (Reims 2011)
60 metres hurdles – 8.31 (Aubière 2011)
High jump – 1.95 (Bompas 2014)
Pole vault – 5.00 (Paris 2011)
Long jump – 6.98 (Paris 2011)
Shot put – 15.39 (Bompas 2014)
Heptathlon – 5795 (Paris 2011)

References

French decathletes
Living people
1988 births
People from Saint-Lô
French male athletes
Sportspeople from Manche
Competitors at the 2011 Summer Universiade